Ralph Webb (born November 21, 1994) is an American football running back who is a free agent. He played college football at Vanderbilt University, and was signed by the New England Patriots as an undrafted free agent after the 2018 NFL Draft.

College career
Webb played in 49 games at Vanderbilt between 2014 and 2017, and rushed for a total of 4,178 yards and 32 touchdowns. Webb hauled in 68 catches for 572 yards and 3 touchdowns.

Professional career

New England Patriots
Webb signed with the New England Patriots as an undrafted free agent on May 11, 2018.

On August 9, 2018, during a preseason game against the Washington Redskins, Webb rushed for 46 yards and scored two touchdowns and two two-point conversions. He was waived on September 1, 2018, and was signed to the practice squad the next day. He was released on October 8, 2018.

Tampa Bay Buccaneers
On November 13, 2018, Webb was signed to the Tampa Bay Buccaneers practice squad. On December 3, he was released.

Pittsburgh Steelers
On December 4, 2018, Webb was signed to the Pittsburgh Steelers practice squad. He signed a reserve/future contract with the Steelers on January 1, 2019. He was waived/injured on August 8 and placed on injured reserve. On August 19, 2019, he was waived with an injury settlement. He was re-signed to the practice squad on November 18, 2019. Webb was selected by the Tampa Bay Vipers in the open phase of the 2020 XFL Draft, but did not sign with the league. On December 30, 2019, he was signed by the Steelers to a reserve/future contract. He was waived on August 2, 2020.

Saskatchewan Roughriders
Webb signed with the Saskatchewan Roughriders of the CFL on February  23, 2021. He was released on July 30, 2021.

References

External links
Vanderbilt Commodores bio

1994 births
Living people
American football running backs
New England Patriots players
Pittsburgh Steelers players
Players of American football from Gainesville, Florida
Saskatchewan Roughriders players
Tampa Bay Buccaneers players
Tampa Bay Vipers players
Vanderbilt Commodores football players